Raphi Kanchanaraphi (1936 – February 19, 2010) was a world-class badminton player who represented both Thailand and Canada in international competition, and won national doubles and mixed doubles titles in both countries.

Career
Known for his anticipation and racket control, Kanchanaraphi was one of a cadre of fine Thai doubles players who helped Thailand to strongly contend for the Thomas Cup (men's international team competition trophy)  in both 1961 and 1964. In partnership with Narong Bhornchima, Kanchanaraphi won 15 of his 18 Thomas Cup doubles matches in those two seasons, the wins including both of his doubles matches against Indonesia in the 1961 Challenge Round.  Kanchanaraphi and Bhornchima were men's doubles runners-up in the prestigious All-England Championships in 1962, narrowly losing to the famous Danes Finn Kobbero and Jorgen Hammergaard Hansen. In 1969 Kanchanaraphi migrated to Canada where he won more titles, and competed in the Thomas Cup campaigns of 1973 and 1976 for Canada with former Thai teammate Channarong Ratanaseangsuang.

Achievements

Southeast Asian Peninsular Games 
Men's doubles

Mixed doubles

International tournaments 
Men's doubles

Mixed doubles

References 

Raphi Kanchanaraphi
Canadian male badminton players
1936 births
2010 deaths
Asian Games medalists in badminton
Badminton players at the 1962 Asian Games
Badminton players at the 1966 Asian Games
Raphi Kanchanaraphi
Raphi Kanchanaraphi
Southeast Asian Games medalists in badminton
Raphi Kanchanaraphi
Raphi Kanchanaraphi
Medalists at the 1962 Asian Games
Medalists at the 1966 Asian Games
Competitors at the 1959 Southeast Asian Peninsular Games